Lihau is a surname that may refer to:

 Jean-Pierre Lihau (born 1975), politician and government minister in the Democratic Republic of the Congo
 Marcel Lihau (1931–1999), Congolese jurist, law professor and politician, inaugural president of the Democratic Republic of the Congo
 Sophie Lihau-Kanza (1940–1999), Congolese politician and sociologist, inaugural first lady of the Democratic Republic of the Congo

See also 

 Lihou
 Lihue, Hawaii

Surnames
Surnames of African origin